"Springfield Splendor" is the second episode of the twenty-ninth season of the American animated television series The Simpsons, and the 620th episode of the series overall. It aired in the United States on Fox on October 8, 2017. This episode is dedicated in memory of Tom Petty, who had a guest appearance in "How I Spent My Strummer Vacation".

Plot
After Lisa has a recurring dream involving the lockers at Springfield Elementary, Homer and Marge decide to seek a therapist. Due to Homer having used all their insurance-covered counseling sessions for a stupid reason, they take her to see a shrink-in-training at Springfield Community College.

There, a therapist student suggests that Lisa draw her typical day. Back home, Lisa is frustrated at her bad drawings, so Marge helps her drawing while she explains her feelings. Lisa takes the drawings to the college, but they fall out of her backpack on the steps that lead into the building. Comic Book Guy's unhappy wife Kumiko collects them and sells them at The Android's Dungeon and Baseball Card Shop as a graphic novel called Sad Girl. Lisa and Marge complain to Comic Book Guy and Kumiko; however, when they see that people are buying (and relating to) the books, Lisa is happy and stops Kumiko from burning them. Marge and Lisa get commissioned by Kumiko to do a sequel, and they bond.

At the Bi-Mon-Sci-Fi-Con, a panel is held by Roz Chast, with Alison Bechdel and Marjane Satrapi, but the public lauds Lisa and hurts Marge's feelings by not wanting to listen to her talk about her drawing work. When Marge tells Lisa she wants more credit, Lisa becomes defensive and they have an argument, which ends with them dissolving their partnership. Soon thereafter, they meet a theatrical director, Guthrie Frenel, who has come by the house and wants to make an avant-garde Broadway show of the books. When the play opens, the play developed by Guthrie focuses on Marge's work and makes a point of giving Lisa/Sad Girl little mention. Lisa is upset and talks to the therapist about it, getting an analogy on parenting that's inspired by the therapist having just had a baby after an affair with her faculty advisor.

At the premiere of Frenel's play, Marge finally notices that the play is terrible and also insulting to Lisa, and feels bad about it. She draws Lisa's face on a spotlight and shines it on the stage, enraging Guthrie, which causes a chain reaction that ruins the show.

During the end credits, Marge presents Maggie her comic "The Adventures of Sad Girl's Mom". Marge still thinks it's good, but Maggie is disappointed with it.

Production 
The episode was scheduled to be the season 29 premiere. However, "The Serfsons" took its place and the episode aired the week after. On October 12, Matt Selman tweeted a video of a cut opening scene from the episode. The scene sees a dream in Homer's head where he's on a show called "Dream Date". He has three women to choose from; the friendly stewardess who winked at him 23 years ago, She-Hulk or the sexy ketchup bottle from the commercial he likes. Homer chooses the ketchup bottle, but then She-Hulk smashes her apart. Homer and She-Hulk then go out on a date, using the broken bottle of ketchup to dip food in.

Reception
Dennis Perkins of The A.V. Club gave the episode a B+ stating, "'Springfield Splendor'’s journey has a lot along the way to perk up the eyes and ears of the jaded Simpsons viewer. The plot, about Lisa and Marge teaming up to tell Lisa’s American Splendor-esque miserablist life story in graphic novel form, allows for an arresting visual style in those scenes where Marge’s pencils are animated to illustrate their comic vision. Accompanied as the stylized images are by a melancholy jazz score (as any real Lisa narrative would be), these sequences have a life of their own that suggests how well the mother-daughter team has captured what’s going on in Lisa’s head every damned day in the yahoo-infested halls of Springfield Elementary. The sequences’ lovely and evocative mix of the internal and external are impressive without being flashy, less a gimmick than an expansion of the show’s capabilities. They’re super."

"Springfield Splendor" scored a 2.2 rating with an 8 share, and was watched by 5.25 million people, making it Fox's highest-rated show of the night.

References

External links
 

2017 American television episodes
The Simpsons (season 29) episodes
Television episodes directed by Matthew Faughnan
Sad Girl